Cotton Hill is a mountain in Schoharie County, New York. It is located northeast of Middleburgh. The Cliff is located southwest and Rundy Cup Mountain is located north of Cotton Hill.

References

Mountains of Schoharie County, New York
Mountains of New York (state)